Activating signal cointegrator 1 is a protein that in humans is encoded by the TRIP4 gene.

Interactions
TRIP4 has been shown to interact with Nuclear receptor coactivator 1.

References

Further reading